David Grossman is an American film and television director. He is best known for his work on the ABC series Desperate Housewives, where he also served as co-executive producer.

Grossman's other television directing credits include Lost, Weird Science, MadTV, Buffy the Vampire Slayer, Angel, CSI: Crime Scene Investigation, Dead Like Me, Malcolm in the Middle, Ally McBeal, Devious Maids, Revenge, The InBetween, Grand Hotel, Why Women Kill, Tell Me a Story, 9-1-1: Lone Star, 9-1-1, Motherland: Fort Salem and In the Dark among other series.

References

External links
 

American film directors
American television directors
American television producers
Daytime Emmy Award winners
Living people
Place of birth missing (living people)
Year of birth missing (living people)